Peter Shapiro (born April 18, 1952) is a retired financial services executive, former member of the Board of Directors of New Israel Fund  and former politician from New Jersey. He was the youngest person ever elected to the New Jersey General Assembly and went on to serve as Essex County Executive and as the Democratic nominee for Governor of New Jersey in 1985 against incumbent Thomas Kean.

Early years 

Shapiro was born in 1952 in Newark, New Jersey, the son of Myron and Henrietta Shapiro, immigrants from Canada. He grew up in Orange, Millburn, and then South Orange, attending Columbia High School in Maplewood. During high school he was suspended for leading a protest against the Vietnam War but was reinstated after the New Jersey chapter of the American Civil Liberties Union intervened. He then attended Harvard College, where he was managing editor of The Harvard Crimson, and received his A.B. degree cum laude in economics and history in 1974.

Political career 

After college, Shapiro returned to Essex County and quickly launched his political career after working for New Jersey Commissioner of Transportation Alan Sagner in Brendan Byrne's administration. He decided to run for the New Jersey General Assembly in 1975. A young unknown, he ran a methodical door-to-door campaign in targeted election districts and had Robert F. Kennedy, Jr., a friend from college, accompany him on election eve. He defeated the Democratic organization candidate, Rocco Neri, by a margin of 183 votes out of 8,530 cast. At 23, he was the youngest person ever elected to the Assembly. He was in the Assembly for two terms, from 1976 to 1979, serving as chairman of the Housing Committee and vice chairman of the Appropriations Committee.

In 1978, he helped push through a change in the Essex County charter creating the position of county executive. Shapiro ran for the new office, defeating the well-entrenched Democratic organization led by county chairman Harry Lerner. Four years later he was reelected with 69 percent of the vote. During his tenure as county executive, he worked for administrative reform, reorganizing 69 agencies under 8 principal departments.
 
Shapiro became active in state and national Democratic politics. He supported Ted Kennedy, uncle of his college friend Robert F. Kennedy, Jr., in the 1980 Democratic presidential primaries. He considered opposing Millicent Fenwick in the 1982 race for United States Senate, but declined to run, and Fenwick went on to lose to Frank Lautenberg. He supported Walter Mondale in the 1984 Democratic presidential primaries.

1985 gubernatorial campaign

In 1985, at the age of 33, Shapiro announced that he would run for Governor of New Jersey against the popular Republican incumbent Thomas Kean. He styled a campaign of "new ideas" on the model of Gary Hart's 1984 presidential run. Some observers also saw similarities to Robert Redford's role in the 1972 film The Candidate, especially when Shapiro's campaign commercials used the slogan, A Better Way, also used in the film.

Shapiro defeated four other candidates in the Democratic primary: State Senate majority leader John F. Russo, Newark Mayor Kenneth A. Gibson, former State Senator Stephen B. Wiley, and former U.S. Attorney for the District of New Jersey Robert Del Tufo. Shapiro finished with 31% of the vote, Russo 27%, and Gibson 26%, with Wiley and Del Tufo each garnering under 10%.

Shapiro ran well behind Kean in the polls throughout the general election campaign, and Kean ultimately won in a record landslide, carrying all of New Jersey's 21 counties and nearly every municipality. Shapiro was defeated by Kean 71%-24%, the largest margin in a gubernatorial election in New Jersey history. The only municipalities that Shapiro carried were Audubon Park and Chesilhurst in Camden County, and Roosevelt in Monmouth County.

In 1986, Shapiro lost his reelection bid for Essex County Executive to Republican Nicholas R. Amato by a margin of 12,000 votes. Shapiro had been weakened by a falling out with Raymond M. Durkin, who chaired both the New Jersey Democratic State Committee and the Essex County Democratic committee.

Business career 

Shapiro moved into the private sector, spending six years at Citibank, where he served as a senior banker and headed the municipal derivatives business and public finance department.  He then served as senior vice president of Euro Brokers, a leading derivative specialist, for five years. In 1997 he founded Swap Financial Group, an independent advisor and arranger of interest rate derivatives. He retired from Swap Financial Group in 2019.

Shapiro married Bryna Linett, a teacher, in 1982, and they have a son.

References

External links
Biographical information for Peter Shapiro from The Political Graveyard

1952 births
20th-century American businesspeople
20th-century American politicians
21st-century American businesspeople
American bankers
Candidates in the 1985 United States elections
Columbia High School (New Jersey) alumni
Essex County, New Jersey executives
Harvard College alumni
Living people
Democratic Party members of the New Jersey General Assembly
People from Orange, New Jersey
Politicians from Essex County, New Jersey
The Harvard Crimson people